Burnetts Corner is a village in the town of Groton, Connecticut, and the site of Burnett's Corner Historic District, a historic district listed on the National Register of Historic Places.

History 
Burnett's Corner grew up in the 18th and 19th centuries as a crossroads village and stagecoach stop on the Post Road that connected New York City and Boston. It takes its name from Richard Burnett (1801–1890), a former sea captain who operated the Pequot Hotel as an overnight stop on the Post Road. Burnett's Corner was bypassed by the railroad that was built through the area in 1858 and that largely replaced stagecoach travel.

Early in the 20th century, Burnett's Corner was the site of small-scale manufacturing operations, notably including a witch hazel mill built by T. N. Dickinson, Jr., in about 1907 and a ropewalk operated by a twine manufacturer. After the Gold Star Highway was built through the area in the 1930s, Burnett's Corner took on the function of a suburban community, housing people who commute to work by automobile.

Historic district 
Burnett's Corner Historic District was listed on the National Register of Historic Places in 1997.  It includes 30 contributing buildings and three other contributing sites over a  linear area along the Old Post Road (now Packer Road). Buildings in the district include representative examples of vernacular domestic architecture of the 18th, 19th, and 20th centuries, including "fine examples" of both Colonial and Greek Revival styles. The Greek Revival-style Pequot Hotel, built in about 1842, is prominently located in the center of the district.

See also
National Register of Historic Places listings in New London County, Connecticut

References

Groton, Connecticut
Vernacular architecture in the United States
Historic districts in New London County, Connecticut
Populated places in New London County, Connecticut
National Register of Historic Places in New London County, Connecticut
Historic districts on the National Register of Historic Places in Connecticut